Scofray Nana Yaw Yeboah (born 13 September 1980) is a Ghanaian writer, author, columnist, and a transformational coach.

He is also a certified ontological mindfulness and ecological coach from Ideal Coaching Global in San Francisco, California in the USA.

He is a 2019 Fellow of the Crans Montana Forum (CMF), a Switzerland based international organization made up of current and past presidents, prime ministers and notable business people.

He is a media analyst and consultant. He is an alumnus of Koforidua Senior high technical school and the President of the old students association. He is a member of the National Society of Black Engineers. He is also a trained facilitator at the Institute of Healing Memories in Cape Town, South Africa. He was recognised as one of the Most Influential Young Ghanaians in 2015 and 2016. He is also the President of Eastern Konnect, a network for old students associations in the Eastern Region of Ghana.

Scofray is recognised by Speakers Bureau Africa as one of Ghana's top 100 Speakers. He is the President and Lead trainer for SLIT Africa, a non profit organization based in Bloemfontein, South Africa.

He is also the lead trainer and consultant at Zoweh Global Consult.

Early life
Scrofray was born on 13 September 1980 at Adweso in the Eastern Region of Ghana. His father was Mr Ebenezer Yaw Otu and mother, Victoria Abena Kwakyewaa. He comes from Akropong Akuapem in the Eastern Region of Ghana.

Education 
Scofray attended the St. Dominic's Catholic school in Adweso for his basic education in 1995.

In January 1996 to December 1998, he attended Koforidua Senior High Technical School in Koforidua, Ghana.

He attended City & Guilds Institute of London where he studied microcomputer technology and electrical-electronics engineering. He is a certified professional trainer by IAPPD United Kingdom.

In May 2021, he obtained a certificate in ontological mindfulness and ecological coach from the Ideal Coaching Global in San Francisco, California, USA. 

In 2022, he completed a certifying training in mBIT Coaching from the NeuroCoach Institute in South Africa.

Career 
Scofray has worked in several capacities as a brand expert, corporate trainer, transformational coach, writer and author. As a Columnist, he has 34 publications to his credit at ModernGhana.com.

He is also a media analyst and the lead consultant for Zoweh Global Consult.

Awards and recognition 
Scofray was honored as a fellow of Crans Montana Forum 2019.

He was nominated in the Special Recognition category for the Africa Youth's Award in 2016.

He is recognized as the first Ghanaian and African to graduate from Ideal Coaching Global in San Francisco, California in the USA.

Books 
Scofray has authored 34 publications on ModernGhana.com and books.

 Branding 360
 Art of Life
 Transformational Pearls

Further reading 
 Some Samaritans Worthy of Appreciation in little Isaac amputation story - February 5, 2019
 Self-help to stop the increasing of Dopamine in the usage of social media - January 23, 2019
 Awareness and support promotes healing - January 15, 2019
 Midland Savings and Loans saga; The reality of Ghana's Customer Care Service - July 22, 2018
 Letter to Christiane Amanpour; The rage of Ghanaians was not against Moesha - April 18, 2018
What happens when c-suites and chros lack emotional intelligence - April 17, 2018
Looking at "Ghanaians are unhappy" according to report and possible causes - March 16, 2018
Why every 21st Century CEO and Leader must acquire - February 11, 2018

References

External links
https://scofray.wordpress.com/
http://slitafrica.org/team/scofray-yeboah/
https://www.listennotes.com/podcasts/time-with-scof-tws-podcast-scofray-nana-yaw-HxL8YisXoIJ/



1980 births
Ghanaian Christians
Living people
21st-century Ghanaian writers
Koforidua Senior High Technical School alumni